Morris County Courthouse is located on Washington Street between Court Street and Western Avenue in the town of Morristown in Morris County, New Jersey. The courthouse was built in 1827 and was added to the National Register of Historic Places on August 19, 1977, for its significance in architecture and politics/government. It was added as a contributing property of the Morristown Historic District on November 13, 1986.

History and description
The first courthouse for the county was built in 1755 in the Morristown Green. The second one was built in 1770, also in the Green. In 1826, the county decided to build a third courthouse, located on Washington Street. It was designed by architect Lewis Carter featuring both Greek Revival and Federal architecture. The three story building was completed in 1827 by contractor Joseph M. Lindsley using brick with brownstone trim.

See also
County courthouses in New Jersey
Richard J. Hughes Justice Complex
National Register of Historic Places listings in Morris County, New Jersey
Federal courthouses in New Jersey

References

External links
 
 
 

Morristown, New Jersey
Courthouses on the National Register of Historic Places in New Jersey
Federal architecture in New Jersey
Government buildings completed in 1827
Buildings and structures in Morris County, New Jersey
County courthouses in New Jersey
National Register of Historic Places in Morris County, New Jersey
Individually listed contributing properties to historic districts on the National Register in New Jersey
New Jersey Register of Historic Places
1827 establishments in New Jersey